High Court of Parliament may refer to:

 In the United Kingdom, the formal name of Parliament.
 The High Court of Parliament Act, 1952, an attempt by the Nationalist government of South Africa to circumvent entrenched clauses in the constitution

See also
 High court
 Superior court
 Supreme court
 High Court of Justice (disambiguation)